Endless Dungeon is an upcoming tower defense twin-stick shooter video game developed by Amplitude Studios and published by Sega. The game is a successor to Dungeon of the Endless (2014) and is scheduled for a May 2023 release for Microsoft Windows, PlayStation 4, PlayStation 5, Xbox One and Xbox Series X and Series S. A Nintendo Switch port is also in the works.

Gameplay
In Endless Dungeon, the player must control a squad of three characters as they explore an abandoned space station. The game will feature eight playable characters at launch, with each having their own unique weapons, skills and abilities. If the player plays solo, they will only assume direct control of one character, while issuing commands to the others. The game also supports cooperative multiplayer, allowing up to three players to work and coordinate with each other.

The squad's goal is to protect a "Crystal Bot" as it moves towards a bulkhead door of each level. The game features ten different levels, and each floor of the space station is procedurally generated. While exploring, players would find new rooms which have generator spots that grant them new resources, including food, science, industry and Dust Shard. They can be used to heal the squad, research and build turrets, and upgrade the Crystal Bot. However, hordes of enemies may also spawn and attempt to destroy the Crystal Bot. While the game plays in real-time, resources would only be given to the player when they open a new door.

Endless Dungeon also includes elements from rogue-lite games. When the player dies or fails their objectives, they will respawn at a saloon bar area where they can talk to other characters and acquire upgrades and weapon attachments before they begin another run.

Development
Endless Dungeon is currently being developed by Amplitude Studios. It was envisioned as a successor to Dungeon of the Endless, which was released in 2014. The team was surprised by player's enthusiasm for that game's multiplayer, which was described by the team as "kind of barebones in many aspects". As a result, Endless Dungeon was designed to be a multiplayer game from the ground up. However, the game still includes single-player. The squad size was reduced from four to three because the team felt that solo players would be overwhelmed if they are controlling and managing all four characters at the same time. Endless Dungeon is set between Dungeon of the Endless and Endless Space 2. As a result, lore, technology and races from those game also return in Endless Dungeon.

Publisher Sega and Amplitude Studios first announced the game at The Game Awards 2020. The game will be part of Sega's OpenDev program, in which selected players can experience targeted gameplay scenarios and provide feedback to the developers. The game is set to be released on May 18, 2023 for Microsoft Windows, PlayStation 4, PlayStation 5, Xbox One and Xbox Series X/S, followed by the Nintendo Switch at a later date.

References

External links
 

Amplitude Studios games
Multiplayer and single-player video games
Nintendo Switch games
PlayStation 4 games
PlayStation 5 games
Roguelike video games
Science fiction video games
Sega video games
Tower defense video games
Twin-stick shooters
Upcoming video games scheduled for 2023
Video games developed in France
Video games set in outer space
Video games using procedural generation
Windows games
Xbox One games
Xbox Series X and Series S games